Dammu is a 2012 Indian Telugu-language action film written and directed by Boyapati Srinu. Starring Jr. NTR, Trisha and Karthika Nair, the film follows an orphan who agrees to pose as the heir to a rich and powerful family, eventually becoming embroiled in a dispute with the rival family. The film co-stars Nassar, Sampath Raj, Rahul Dev, Kishore, Suman, Brahmanandam, Ali, Bhanupriya, Kota Srinivasa Rao and Venu Thottempudi.

The film was released theatrically on 27 April 2012, along with a Tamil dubbed version titled Singamagan. On 15. Mostly negative reviews and became box office failure. The film was unofficially remade in Bengali (Bangladesh) as Rajababu - The Power starring Shakib Khan, Apu Biswas and Bobby.

Plot
Rama Chandra is an orphan who leads a simple life along with his friend. He falls in love with Sathya, who is a very rich girl. Sathya imposes a condition that Rama Chandra's family history and pedigree are very important. At this very moment, Rama Chandra learns that a rich and powerful royal Suryavamsi family seeks to adopt an heir, and he seizes the chance. Once he goes there, he realizes that things are not as simple as they seem. The family has a violent past and a bitter dispute with another rich and powerful royal Chandravamsi family headed by a Chandravamsi King. He also realizes that thousands of people in the area are now dependent on him for their very survival. He also discovers that he is the real heir to the family. Rama Chandra does not like violence and tries his best to solve the problems peacefully. But the rival gang does not give him a chance. Vexed with the violence, Rama Chandra nearly kills the Chandravamsi King's eldest son and kills King's youngest son. He opens the Chandravamsi King's eyes by placing a sword on his middle son. In the climax, the Chandravamsi King realizes that he was wrong and apologizes to all. Rama Chandra becomes the hero of the village.

Cast

 Jr. NTR as Rama Chandra / Raja Vasireddy Vijayadwaja Srisimha
 Trisha as Sathya
 Karthika Nair as Neelaveni
 Nassar as Chandravamsi King
 Brahmanandam as Jaanaki
 Bhanupriya as Rama Chandra's mother
 Venu Thottempudi as Rama Chandra's brother-in-law
 Abhinaya as Rama Chandra's elder sister
 Hari Teja as Rama Chandra's elder sister
 Chitralekha as  Rama Chandra's elder sister
 Suman as Suryavamsi King/Raja Surya Pratap Singh
 Kota Srinivasa Rao as Raja of Veera Durgam Fort
 Ahuti Prasad as Neelaveni's father
 Ali as Rama Chandra's friend
 Rahul Dev as Police Officer 
 Sampath Raj as Chandravamsi King's elder son
 Kishore as Chandravamsi King's second son
 Sridhar Rao as Chandravamsi King's third son
 Tanikella Bharani as Head Priest 
 Chalapathi Rao as Krishnam Raju
 Subhalekha Sudhakar as Sathya's father
 Prabhakar as Chandravamsi King's henchmen
 Snigdha as Sathya's friend
 Kolla Ashok Kumar as Rama Chandra's servant
 Chatrapathi Sekhar
 Prasad Babu
 Rahul Mahajan (uncredited appearance)
 Maryam Zakaria as item number

Production
Dammu has music scored by M. M. Keeravani. Shruti Hassan, who was originally signed to play the female lead, walked out citing date issues. Later the producers approached Kajal Aggarwal who also couldn't accommodate bulk dates for the film. The producers finalised Trisha as the first female lead. According to reports, Bhanupriya, Kota Srinivasa Rao, Venu Thottempudi and Subhalekha Sudhakar play supporting roles.

Release 
The Telugu and Tamil versions released on 27 April 2012. Dammu released on approximately 2550 screens worldwide which was a record in Tollywood. It released in approx of 140+ theatres in Karnataka which is considered to be a record by out of state movie.

Critical reception
Deccan Chronicle wrote: "Dammu (Valour), as one of the Telugu films that made high on action and low on contents". Sify wrote: "Boyapati uses the same formula of Tollywood action movies with good dialogues, high voltage fight sequences and wraps ups with interesting twist and NTR's charged up performance". Rediff wrote: "Director Boyapati Seenu's new film Dammu has an outdated and clichéd storyline, regressive content, and mindless and excessive violence".

Box office
The film completed 50 days in 70 direct centres on 15 June 2012 and it managed to sustain for a long run as expected. and collected a share of 29 crores worldwide. The film completed 100 days on 4 August 2012.

Pre-release revenues

Home media
The VCDs, DVDs and Blu-ray discs of the film were released through Bhavani Company into the market on 10 August 2012, six days after completing 100 days of the film.

Soundtrack

The soundtrack of the film was released on 29 March 2012 at Shilpakala Vedika in Hyderabad. M. M. Keeravani's music label, Vel Records, and Sony Music Entertainment secured the film's audio rights. The lyrics for all the songs were written by Chandrabose.

Awards

Notes

References

External links
 

2010s Telugu-language films
2012 films
2012 masala films
Telugu films remade in other languages
Films scored by M. M. Keeravani
Indian action films
Films directed by Boyapati Srinu
2012 action films